Shahriar County is in Tehran province, Iran. The capital of the county is the city of Shahriar. At the 2006 census, the county's population was 1,044,707 in 273,826 households. The following census in 2011 counted 624,440 people in 178,792 households, by which time Malard District had been separated from the county to form Malard County, and Qods District to become Qods County. At the 2016 census, the county's population was 744,210 in 226,011 households.

Administrative divisions

The population history and structural changes of Shahriar County's administrative divisions over three consecutive censuses are shown in the following table. The latest census shows one district, six rural districts, and seven cities.

References

 

Counties of Tehran Province